61* is a 2001 American made-for-television sports drama film written by Hank Steinberg and directed by Billy Crystal. It stars Barry Pepper as Roger Maris and Thomas Jane as Mickey Mantle on their quest to break Babe Ruth's 1927 single-season home run record of 60 during the 1961 season of the New York Yankees. The film first aired on HBO on April 28, 2001.

Plot
In 1998, the family of the late Roger Maris goes to Busch Stadium to witness Mark McGwire of the St. Louis Cardinals break their father's record with a 62nd home run. Maris' widow, Pat, is hospitalized due to complications from arrhythmia and watches the game on television from a hospital bed.

Decades earlier in 1961, Maris is presented with the Most Valuable Player award for the 1960 baseball season, but Mickey Mantle remains the New York Yankees' superstar. Mantle starts off hot while Maris struggles. Maris suspects he may be traded, but new manager Ralph Houk has Mantle and Maris switch places in the Yankees' batting order to see if it helps. It does, and Maris begins to hit home runs at a record pace. Mantle keeps pace and it becomes clear that both "M&M Boys" will make a run at Babe Ruth's record of 60 homers in one season.

Mickey's life off the field is taking a toll on his playing. He drinks, enjoys the Manhattan nightlife and arrives at the ballpark hung over. More than once, pitcher Whitey Ford has to bail him out or sober him up. To keep Mantle out of trouble, Maris and teammate/roommate Bob Cerv invite him to move in with them in a modest home in Queens, with one condition: no women.

New York's fans and media pull for the popular and personable Mantle, a long-time Yankee. The quieter Maris is viewed as an outsider, aloof and unworthy. As the two men close in on the record, MLB Commissioner Ford Frick, who was Babe Ruth's ghostwriter, makes a decision: unless the record is broken in 154 games, as Ruth did in 1927, the new mark would be listed separately indicating it had been done in baseball's newly expanded 162-game season.

It appears Mantle is not going to make it; his health deteriorates and he plays in constant pain. Maris, meanwhile, is unaccustomed to such a high level of public scrutiny and is uncomfortable interacting with the media, who dissect and distort everything he says or does. The fans heckle Maris and even throw objects at him on the field. Soon he begins receiving hate mail and death threats. His wife lives far from New York, usually available only by phone. The stress becomes so intense that Maris' hair begins to fall out in clumps. The Yankees owner also tries to favor Mantle by asking Houk to switch Mantle and Maris in the batting order, but Houk refuses, because the redesigned lineup has been winning a higher percentage of games.

Chronic injury and alcohol abuse catch up with Mantle, and an ill-advised injection by a doctor infects his hip and lands him in a hospital bed. With Mantle gone from the lineup, the stage becomes set for Maris. He fails to break the record in the 154th game of the season, but he does finally hit his 61st home run during the final game of the season.

Cast
Barry Pepper as Roger Maris
Thomas Jane as Mickey Mantle
Anthony Michael Hall as Whitey Ford
Richard Masur as Milt Kahn
Bruce McGill as Ralph Houk
Chris Bauer as Bob Cerv
Jennifer Crystal Foley as Pat Maris (1961)
Patricia Crowley as Pat Maris (1998)
Christopher McDonald as Mel Allen
Bob Gunton as Dan Topping
Donald Moffat as Ford Frick
Renée Taylor as Claire Ruth
Paul Borghese as Yogi Berra
Peter Jacobson as Artie Green
Seymour Cassel as Sam Simon
Robert Joy as Bob Fishel
Bobby Hosea as Elston Howard
Michael Nouri as Joe DiMaggio
Tom Candiotti as Hoyt Wilhelm
E.E. Bell as Fan impersonating Babe Ruth

Filming locations
Most of the baseball action scenes, including those set at Yankee Stadium, were actually filmed at Tiger Stadium in Detroit, Michigan. A combination of strategic photographing and post-production effects were used to enhance the illusion of the "classic" layout of Yankee Stadium. Tiger Stadium was credited as "playing" Yankee Stadium in the closing credits. Tiger Stadium also "played itself" as the home of the Tigers when the Yankees played them in Detroit.

The shots depicting Fenway Park and Baltimore's Memorial Stadium were shot at the Los Angeles Memorial Coliseum.

Critical reception
Review aggregator Rotten Tomatoes reports that 86% out of 28 professional critics gave the film a positive review, with an average rating of 6.8/10.

Film critic Richard Roeper named 61* one of his top five all-time favorite baseball movies. In 2002, actor Barry Pepper was a Golden Globe nominee for Best Performance by an Actor in a Miniseries or a Motion Picture Made for Television.

Deviations from history

In the beginning of the film, Bob Cerv was seen with the Yankees on Opening Day. In reality, Cerv was a member of the Los Angeles Angels until May and then was traded to the Yankees.

Also on opening day, the broadcast announcer refers to the opposing Minnesota Twins pitcher as Camilo Pascual. In fact, the Twins' pitcher that day was Pedro Ramos, who would later distinguish himself as a reliever for the Yankees. As the Twins are warming up, two players, wearing numbers 2 (Zoilo Versalles) and 7 (Lenny Green) are seen. In the film, number 7 for the Twins throws right-handed and appears to be Caucasian. In fact, Green, who started in center field opening day for the Twins, is an African-American who batted and threw left-handed.

In his 2013 memoir, Still Foolin' 'Em, Billy Crystal recounts how before it aired on HBO, the film was shown at the White House for a small audience that included President George W. Bush, who once owned baseball's Texas Rangers. A home run in the film, depicted as being hit off pitcher Frank Lary, was actually hit off left-hander Hank Aguirre, which the president pointed out to Crystal. Lary gave up Maris' 52nd and 57th homers of that 1961 season, but the one in question (his 53rd) did indeed come against Aguirre.

The film depicts the Yankees 154th game of the season, facing the Baltimore Orioles.  Oriole's pitcher Hoyt Wilhelm is brought in to relieve in the 9th inning with 2 outs to face Maris. Maris had homered earlier in the game for number 59, and if he homered again he would tie Babe Ruth's record of 60 home runs in 154 games. This would give Maris outright share with Ruth of the home run record, voiding commissioner Ford Frick's ruling earlier in July that if Maris did not break Ruth's record by game 154, the records would be separated due to Maris's season being 8 games longer than Ruth's.

The film shows Yankee players in the dugout in disgust at the Orioles bringing their top reliever solely to face Maris, as Wilhelm's effective knuckleball would make it more difficult for Maris to homer off on a windy night. In reality, Wilhelm was brought in at the top of the inning, and had already gotten two Yankees out before facing and getting out Maris. When Wilhelm was brought in, the film shows the Orioles manager threatening to fine him $5,000 if he threw Maris a fastball, a story which has never been confirmed.

References

External links

 61* at the Baseball Movie Guide

2001 films
2001 television films
2000s biographical films
2000s sports films
American baseball films
HBO Films films
Films set in the 1960s
Films set in the Bronx
Films shot in Detroit
Films shot in Los Angeles
Films directed by Billy Crystal
Films about the New York Yankees
Sports television films
Films scored by Marc Shaiman
Biographical films about sportspeople
Cultural depictions of Joe DiMaggio
Films set in 1961
Films set in 1998
2000s American films